Banksia Hill Juvenile Detention Centre is an Australian juvenile prison facility for offenders aged 10–17 years, located at Canning Vale, Western Australia. It was opened in September 1997 to replace Longmore Detention Centre in Bentley.

Overview 
The detainees have access to a variety of activities and educational programs. All detainees have individual "case management plans", which map out the education, training, employment, counselling or other activities they will do whilst in the centre, to work towards their return into the community.

Detainees must attend school until the end of the year they turn 17.

Controversy  
In January 2023, Banksia Hill Juvenile Detention Centre made headlines in Australia after a class action was launched against the facility, involving 500 children and young adults who had been detained at the centre. In an affidavit, an allegation was made by an 18-year-old autistic female who claimed she had her human rights violated while detained–she alleges that she was subjected to shackling, seven months of solitary confinement and physical abuse.

See also
 Rangeview Juvenile Remand Centre

References

 Corrective Services - Banksia Hill Detention Centre

Prisons in Western Australia
1997 establishments in Australia
Juvenile detention centres in Australia
Canning Vale, Western Australia